Lebedskoye (Lebedskiy) is a rural locality (a selo) in Turochaksky District, the Altai Republic, Russia. The population was 2 as of 2016. There are 2 streets.

Geography 
Lebedskoye is located 6 km north of Turochak (the district's administrative centre) by road. Turochak is the nearest rural locality.

References 

Rural localities in Turochaksky District